Kalan Rural District is a rural district (dehestan) in Zarneh District, Eyvan County, Ilam Province, Iran. At the 2006 census, its population was 3,835, in 783 families.  The rural district has 17 villages.

References 

Rural Districts of Ilam Province
Eyvan County